Buğra is a Turkish name and may refer to:

Given name
 Buğra Gülsoy (born 1982), Turkish actor, screenwriter, producer, architect, director, graphic designer and photographer
 Ekrem Buğra Ekinci (born 1966), Turkish academic in History of Turkish Law and Islamic Law
 Rahman Buğra Çağıran, (born 1995), Turkish football player

Surname
 Satuq Bogra Khan,Kara-khanid(uyghur) kagan
 Abdullah Bughra, emir of First East Turkestan Republic
 Muhammad Amin Bughra, father of Abdulla Bugra
 Nur Ahmadjan Bughra
 Ayşe Buğra, Turkish social scientist
 Tarık Buğra (1918-1994), Turkish journalist, novelist and short story author

Places
 Buğra, Kalecik, a village in the District of Kalecik, Ankara Province, Turkey

Turkish-language surnames
Turkish masculine given names